At the 1938 British Empire Games, the athletics events were held at the Sydney Cricket Ground in Sydney, Australia in February 1938. A total of 28 athletics events were contested at the Games, 20 by men and 8 by women.

Medal summary

Men

Invitation events

Women

Medal table

Participating nations

 (78)
 (4)
 (37)
 (24)
 (19)
 (3)
 (4)
 (12)
 (2)
 (3)
 (1)

References

Results
 Commonwealth Games Medallists - Men. GBR Athletics. Retrieved on 2010-09-02.
 Commonwealth Games Medallists - Women. GBR Athletics. Retrieved on 2010-09-02.

External links
 1938 Games Commentary and video of men's 100 yards from British Pathé

1938 British Empire Games events
1938
British Empire Games
1938 British Empire Games